Lower White River Wilderness is a protected wilderness in the US State of Oregon on the southern part of Mount Hood. In 2009, Congress designated the area a National Wilderness preserve.

The White River rises from White River Glacier in White River Canyon. While some additions to the Mount Hood Wilderness protect the upper parts of the river, the Lower River Stretch is protected by the Lower White River Wilderness. Managed by the U.S. Bureau of Land Management and the U.S. Forest Service, Keeps Mill Campground maintains primitive trails, camping areas, and staging areas.

Available activities 
 Camping
 Fishing
 Hiking/Backpacking
 Wildlife Viewing

References

External links 

Lower White River Wilderness Area - BLM page

Protected areas of Wasco County, Oregon
Mount Hood
IUCN Category Ib
Wilderness areas of Oregon
Bureau of Land Management wilderness areas in Oregon
Mount Hood National Forest
2009 establishments in Oregon
Protected areas established in 2009